Prior to 1999 the New Zealand armed forces received honours of the United Kingdom, including military decorations and campaign medals.  Since the end of World War II there have been constant moves towards an independent New Zealand honours system.  This has resulted in a new system of New Zealand honours, military gallantry and civil bravery awards, and campaign medals.

See also
 New Zealand bravery awards (civil)
 New Zealand campaign medals
 New Zealand Honours Order of Precedence
 New Zealand Royal Honours System

Military awards and decorations of New Zealand